Thomas Rivett, Esq. (1713–1763) was a British barrister and politician.

Biography 
Thomas Rivett was a Whig M.P. for Derby between 1748 and 1753, High Sheriff of Derbyshire in 1757. In 1761, like his father, he became Mayor of Derby. He married Anna Maria Sibley in April 1749 with whom he had three children: Thomas, James and Elizabeth.

Thomas Rivett was one of the three owners of the «Cockpit Hill Potworks» china factory, together with William Butts and John Heath.

Thomas Rivett's monogram and his house were drawn by S.H.Parkins and that was given to Derby Museum and Art Gallery.

References

External links 
 BURKE, Bernard (1865). Genealogical and heraldic dictionary of the peerage and baronetage of the british empire

1713 births
1763 deaths
Mayors of Derby
Members of the Parliament of Great Britain for Derby
British MPs 1747–1754
High Sheriffs of Derbyshire